Harry Geithner Cuesta (Bogotá DC, Cundinamarca; March 9, 1967), known as Harry Geithner, is a Colombian actor, film director and producer known for being CEO of Geithnerland Productions Inc., a production company, talent agency and content creator audiovisuals for film, theater, television and social networks located in New York City; where, in addition, acting classes, voice education, performing arts and accent neutralization are taught. One of his sisters (his twin) is Aura Cristina Geithner, a prominent actress and singer.

Biography 

Harry Geithner graduated with a Bachelor of Business Administration from the Monterrey Institute of Technology and Higher Education (ITESM) in Mexico City; and then he formed two companies: A publishing company called "EL MÉXICO MODERNO" and an Exporting and Importing company, called "HG" in both Mexico and Colombia. Harry is a professional photographer and in his youth he worked creating portfolios for young artists and aspiring actors.

At the age of 26 he began to study Dramatic Art, Philosophy and Letters, Voice Education, Performing Arts, Theater, Film and Television at the CONARTE Academy, in Colombia, being his great mentor, teacher Norman Karin. Later, he studied Television, Film and Theater in Mexico, at the MM Studio Academy of Patricia Reyes Spíndola.

In his native country, he participated in soap operas such as Café con aroma de mujer, Paloma, Sueños y Espejos, Momposina, De pies a cabeza, among others. He later traveled to Mexico, where he was hired by Televisa Network, in a Carla Estrada production to perform a villain character called "Lencho" in the telenovela Te sigo amando. This performance established him as the winner of the ACE award in New York in 1999.

In Mexico he received the Las Palmas de Oro award -in 1997- for his role in 'Te Sigo Amando' as Revelation Actor.

In 1998, he was awarded Las Palmas de Oro León in Mexico as 'Best Young Actor with the Greatest Impact on Television', awarded by the Círculo Nacional de Periodistas A.C.

Harry Geithner is also the winner of an Emmy Award for his work as co-host, along with Ana Maria Canseco. from the broadcast of the Tournament of Rose Parade in Pasadena, California on Univision.

From 1999 to 2001, Harry Geithner was the co-host of the television game show "A Que No Te Atreves", alongside actresses Sofia Vergara and Adriana Lavat. This program was a huge success in the United States, and was one of the most watched on the Univision network, produced by Cristina Saralegui.

Currently, Harry maintains a romantic relationship with the Argentine businesswoman Alejandra Soledad Silva, and both are based in New York City.

In the United States, Harry has received numerous recognitions and awards - Citations and Certificates of Merit as an outstanding citizen - from the government for his work and trajectory in acting for the Hispanic market in that country.

Filmography

Films

As actor

As film director

Tv Series

As film director

Tv Performances

Awards and nominations

Spanish People Awards

Atlixco Film Festival (Mexico)

Hudson International Film Festival NYC

Otros premios 

 ACE Awards (Asociación de Cronistas del Espectáculo de New York)
 Palmas de Oro (Círculo Nacional de Periodistas de México)
 Palmas de Oro Leon (Círculo Nacional de Periodistas de México)
 Premio Paoli (Puerto Rico)
 Emmy Award (Univision - Pasadena, California)
 Micrófono de Oro 2019 (Asociación Nacional de Locutores de México A.C.)
 Certificate of Recognition 2019 (State of New York - Executive Chamber)
 Citation as prominent citizen (2019 - Office of the Executive - Nassau County - State of New York)
 Citation as prominent citizen (2019 - Awarded by Senator Kevin Thomas of the New York Senate)
 Certificate of Appreciation 2019 (City of Huntington Park, Los Angeles awarded by the mayor Karina Macias)

References

External links 

Living people
1967 births
Male actors from Bogotá
Colombian male film actors
Colombian male telenovela actors
21st-century Colombian male actors
20th-century Colombian male actors
Colombian people of German descent